Echo is a 2007 Danish drama film, directed by Anders Morgenthaler, and starring Kim Bodnia.

External links
IMDb profile

2007 films
Danish drama films
Films directed by Anders Morgenthaler
2000s Danish-language films